Old Gold is a brand of dark chocolate in Australia dating back to 1916, now made by Cadbury.

Blocks of the chocolate are produced in "Original" (45% cocoa solids), "Old Jamaica", ""Roast Almond", "70% Cocoa" and "Peppermint" varieties.

The "Old Gold" brand was initially established by confectionery company MacRobertson's.

References

Australian confectionery
Chocolate